This is a chronological list of Australian films of the 1950s. For a complete alphabetical list, see :Category:Australian films.



1950s

See also
 1950 in Australia
 1951 in Australia
 1952 in Australia
 1953 in Australia
 1954 in Australia
 1955 in Australia
 1956 in Australia
 1957 in Australia
 1958 in Australia
 1959 in Australia
 1959 in Australian television

External links
 Australian film at the Internet Movie Database

 
 
1950s
Australian
Films